William Morris Feigenbaum (December 25, 1886 – April 23, 1949) was an American statistician, journalist and politician from New York.

Life
He was born on December 25, 1886, in Antwerp, Belgium, the son of Benjamin Feigenbaum (1860–1932)  and Matilda (Kaminsky) Feigenbaum, both originally from Warsaw. The family emigrated to the United States and settled in Brooklyn where he attended the public schools and Boys High School. He graduated A.B. from Columbia College in 1907, and A.M. from Columbia University in 1908. He also took courses at Dartmouth College, Wisconsin University and National University School of Law. From 1909 to 1912, he worked in the Bureau of Statistics and Accounts of the Interstate Commerce Commission in Washington, D.C. In 1912, he returned to New York and worked for the New York Public Service Commission (1st D.).

He was a member of the Socialist Party of America. In November 1916, he ran for Congress in the 10th District, but was defeated by the incumbent Republican Reuben L. Haskell.

In November 1917, he was elected to the New York State Assembly (Kings County, 6th District), defeating the incumbent Republican Nathan D. Shapiro. Feigenbaum polled 3,694 votes, Shapiro polled 3,184 votes, and Democrat Martin Solomon polled 2,217. Feigenbaum was one of ten Socialist members of the 141st New York State Legislature in 1918.

Afterwards he became the associated editor of The New Leader, and wrote for several newspapers and political magazines.

In 1930 and 1932, he ran for the New York State Senate (4th D.) but was defeated both times by Democrat Philip M. Kleinfeld.

He died on April 23, 1949, at the Montgomery Nursing Home in Brooklyn.

References

1886 births
1949 deaths
American people of Belgian-Jewish descent
Politicians from Brooklyn
Members of the New York State Assembly
Socialist Party of America politicians from New York (state)
Belgian emigrants to the United States
Belgian Jews
Belgian people of Polish-Jewish descent
Columbia College (New York) alumni
20th-century American newspaper editors
20th-century American politicians
Boys High School (Brooklyn) alumni